Air Mandalay was a regional airline based in Yangon. Its main base was Yangon International Airport. In early April 2015, two newly leased Embraer ERJ 145 jets joined its fleet.

History
The airline was established on 6 October 1994 and started operations on 18 October that year with a flight from Yangon to Mandalay. It was the first domestic and regional joint venture airline in Myanmar. Director of Flight Operations was Captain Zaw Thein, and Chief Pilot was Captain James Keep. On 27 August 1995, Air Mandalay started its first international service from Yangon to Chiang Mai in Thailand.

The airline ceased operations on September 4, 2018 amidst overcapacity in Myanmar's aviation market with all of its flights incorporated by Myanmar National Airlines.

Destinations

Air Mandalay served the following destinations (as of August 2018):

Myanmar
Sittwe - Sittwe Airport
Tachilek - Tachilek Airport
Yangon - Yangon International Airport, main hub
Myitkyina - Myitkyina Airport

Fleet

Current fleet
As of August 2018 the Air Mandalay fleet comprised the following aircraft:

Former fleet
 3 ATR 42-320
 4 ATR 72-212

See also
 List of airlines of Burma

References

External links

 http://www.airmandalay.com/

Defunct airlines of Myanmar
Airlines established in 1994
Airlines disestablished in 2018